Dolina Sunca was a Croatian soap opera that aired on Croatian Radiotelevision from 2009 to 2010.

Plot
Eva Kralj, a beautiful widow, wishing to start a new life, moves from Zagreb to the lively place of Jablanovo. Upon arrival in Jablanovo, Eva discovers a shocking secret: her late husband led a double life and lived with Julija Vitezović, his mistress with whom he had a child. Julija, the popular mayor of Jablanovo, has a wealthy family and a large agricultural estate.

The two women pass through a challenging time of hostility, dating, and approaching. Eva's arrival in Jablanovo turns the settlement upside down. Two men slowly enter Eva's life, the withdrawn and charming Andrija and Christian, but she is still hurt emotionally. Andrija and Kristijan fall for Eva, but they both have their problems: Andrija carries a burden of guilt for a serious accident that took place in Jablanovo, while Kristijan had faced betrayal and the struggle for supremacy in the family business.

Cast
Bojana Gregoric as Julija Vitezovic (2009–2010)
Ana Vilenica as Eva Kralj (2009–2010)
Robert Kurbaša as Andrija Bukovac (2009–2010)
Ivan Herceg as Kristijan Vitezovic (2009–2010)
Tamara Šoletić as Loreta (2009–2010)
Marija Omaljev-Grbić as Natasa Sever Vitezovic (2009–2010)
Petar Ciritovic as Juran Vitezovic (2009–10)
Slavko Sobin as Matej Zlatarić (2010)
Visnja Babic as Ruza Bukovac (2009–10)
Krunoslav Saric as Ivan (2009–10)
Csilla Barath-Bastaic as Lada (2009–10)
Vlasta Ramljak as Adela (2009–10)
Zijad Gracic as Nikola (2009–10)
Otokar Levaj as Dr. Otto (2009)
Niksa Marinovic as Fra Jakov (2009–10)
Sandra Loncaric as Visnja Horvat (2009–10)
Alan Katic as Kruno  (2009–10)
Nives Canovic as Tina (2009–10)
Ozren Domiter as Karlo (2009–10)
Ranko Zidaric as Gordan Tomek (2010)
Mirna Medakovic as Sonja (2009–10)
Marija Tadic as Irena (2009–10)
Nadezda Perisic-Nola as Renata (2010)
Barbara Prpic as Stela (2009–10
Miraj Grbić as Lawyer (2009)

References

Croatian television soap operas
2009 Croatian television series debuts
2010 Croatian television series endings
2000s Croatian television series
2010s Croatian television series
Croatian Radiotelevision original programming